Slovenski svetec in učitelj is a novel by Slovenian author Josip Jurčič. It was first published in 1886.

See also
List of Slovenian novels

Slovenian novels
1886 novels